Malabika Sarkar is an Indian academic, former Vice-Chancellor of Ashoka University,  and a former Vice Chancellor of Presidency University, Kolkata. She was the first Dean of Faculty & Research at Ashoka and was the Principal Academic Advisor before succeeding Pratap Bhanu Mehta to become the 3rd Vice-Chancellor. She is a professor of English Literature and specializes in John Milton, with an added interest in the History of Science. Her book Cosmos and Character in Paradise Lost was published by Palgrave Macmillan in June 2012. She stepped down as Vice Chancellor on 10 November 2022.

Biography
She is an alumna of Presidency College (then under the University of Calcutta), where she was a student of English literature. She went on to complete her B.A. and M.A. from New Hall, Cambridge University. Later a graduate student at Clare Hall, she returned to Clare Hall, Cambridge University, as visiting fellow in 2002–2003 and in 2003 was elected to a life membership. She is a Fellow of the English Association (FEA), U.K..

Sarkar was earlier professor of English at Jadavpur University, Kolkata, head of the Department of English from 1999-2001, a member of the Jadavpur University Council from 1980-1985, and member of various academic bodies of the University. She was also a member of the University Grants Commission Panel of Experts in English and Foreign Languages and a panel member of NAAC.

Sarkar has presented her work at several conferences in the U.K. and North America. She combines her interest in Milton and the Renaissance with another area of interest, Romantic Studies. She is the founder President of the Centre for Studies in Romantic Literature and continues to direct its international conferences. Her publications in this area include  Moneta’s Veil: Essays on 19th Century Literature (Pearson-Longman, 2010). She is on the international advisory board of the journal European Romantic Review published by Routledge. Her many publications include her article on "The Magic of Shakespeare’s Sonnets", first published in Renaissance Studies (U.K., 1998), which was reprinted in Shakespeare Criticism Yearbook 1998 (Gale Group, USA).

Sarkar is now a member of the Presidency University Governing Board.

She is also president of the Women's Coordinating Council (WCC), West Bengal, the apex women's organization in the state with representatives from more than 74 social welfare organizations.

Publications
 Moneta's Veil : Essays in Nineteenth Century Literature, 2009
 Cosmos and character in Paradise Lost, 2011

References

Presidency University, Kolkata alumni
Academic staff of Presidency University, Kolkata
University of Calcutta alumni
Scholars from Kolkata
Year of birth missing (living people)
Living people
Fellows of the English Association
West Bengal academics